The Savannah and Statesboro Railway began in 1897 through a reorganization of the Cuyler and Woodburn Railroad. The S&S also controlled the Savannah, Augusta and Northern Railway from 1911 until 1916 when the SA&N was taken over by the Midland Railway.

The S&S lasted until 1933 when it was abandoned; a stub at Statesboro became the Statesboro Terminal Company, leased by the Georgia and Florida Railroad (through the Statesboro Northern Railway) until its abandonment in about 1950.

References

Defunct Georgia (U.S. state) railroads
Railway companies established in 1897
Railway companies disestablished in 1933

Now used by the Georgia southern railway owned by 
Pioneer Lines